The 1976 Cornell Big Red football team was an American football team that represented Cornell University during the 1976 NCAA Division I football season. Cornell tied for last place in the Ivy League. 

In its second and final season under head coach George Seifert, the team compiled a 2–7 record and was outscored 177 to 109. Team captains were chosen on a game-by-game basis. 

Cornell's 2–5 conference record placed it in a four-way tie for fifth place, at the bottom of the Ivy League standings. The Big Red were outscored 131 to 75 by Ivy opponents. 

Cornell played its home games at Schoellkopf Field in Ithaca, New York.

Schedule

References

Cornell
Cornell Big Red football seasons
Cornell Big Red football